Amestejan (also Romanized as Amestejān, Amastjan, and Amestajān; also known as Anestavān and Anistavan) is a village in Chehregan Rural District, Tasuj District, Shabestar County, East Azerbaijan Province, Iran. At the 2006 census, its population was 368, in 118 families.

References 

Populated places in Shabestar County